(I Would Do) Anything for You is a 1932 jazz standard. It was written by Alex Hill, Claude Hopkins and Bob Williams.
The first recording was by Claude Hopkins and His Orchestra (with vocal refrain) on May 24, 1932 for Columbia Records (No. 2665D). There have been many instrumental versions of the tune, notably by Benny Goodman (1936) and  Art Tatum (1934). Significant vocal versions include:
Frankie Laine - for his album Reunion in Rhythm (1959)
Kay Starr - Kay Starr: Jazz Singer (1960)
Nat King Cole - Tell Me All About Yourself (1960)

See also
List of jazz standards

References

1930s jazz standards
1932 songs